{{DISPLAYTITLE:Tau2 Aquarii}}

Tau2 Aquarii, Latinized from τ2 Aquarii, is the Bayer designation for a single star in the equatorial constellation of Aquarius. It is visible to the naked eye with an apparent visual magnitude of +4.0. Because the star lies near the ecliptic it is subject to occultations by the Moon. The star is located at a distance of approximately 318 light years from the Sun based on parallax.

This is an orange-hued red giant star with a stellar classification of K5 III. After exhausting the supply of hydrogen at its core, the aging star cooled and expanded off the main sequence. It now has 52 times the radius of the Sun and is radiating 614 times the Sun's luminosity from its enlarged photosphere at an effective temperature of 4,007 K. This is a suspected variable star with a brightness that has been measured ranging from visual magnitude 3.98 down to 4.04.

A magnitude 9.94 visual companion to this star was reported by W. Herschel in 1782, and it has the modern discovery code .

References

External links
 Image τ2 Aquarii

K-type giants
Suspected variables

Aquarius (constellation)
Aquarii, Tau2
BD-14 6354
Aquarii, 071
216032
112716
8679